Ru Zhijuan (Wade–Giles: Ju Chih-chüan, 30 October 1925 – 7 October 1998) was a Chinese writer best known for her short stories. Ru was one of the most important writers of her generation. Her second daughter Wang Anyi is also a famous writer.

Biography
Ru Zhijuan, the youngest of 5 children, was born in Shanghai to migrants from Hangzhou. When she was 3, her mother died and her father left; she and a brother were raised by their grandmother. She did not begin primary school until age 10, and a year later moved to Hangzhou with her grandmother, who died shortly after. She was sent to an orphanage in Shanghai. After a year each at a women's vocational school, a Christian missionary boarding school for girls, and a county school, she graduated from secondary school with only four years of schooling. She taught school for a short time in 1943 before joining the propaganda division of the New Fourth Army. In 1944, she married Wang Xiaoping, who was born in Singapore but arrived in China to fight the Japanese. In 1947, she joined the Communist Party of China. In 1955, she became the editor of the Monthly for Literature and Art, retiring in 1960 to write full-time.

The 1958 short story "Lilies" was criticized by some for its "bourgeois sentimentality" but became popular after it was praised by Minister of Culture and author Mao Dun. Many of her stories of this period were intended to show popular support for the revolution and the communist party. She also dealt with the changes in Chinese society from traditional values. She did not publish any work from 1962 to 1965, because it was felt at the time that her work dealt with the worries of everyday people rather than more important issues.

She regained favour when the values from the Cultural Revolution were being reconsidered. They are generally critical of earlier policies and promote the new social norms.

She served as party secretary for the Shanghai Writer's Association. She died in Shanghai at the age of 73.

Works translated into English

Filmography

Major awards
1980: 2nd National Short Story Prize, "A Story Out of Sequence" ("A Badly Edited Story")

References

1925 births
1998 deaths
Short story writers from Shanghai
20th-century Chinese women writers
International Writing Program alumni
Chinese women short story writers
People's Republic of China essayists
Chinese women essayists
20th-century Chinese short story writers
20th-century essayists
People's Republic of China short story writers
People of the Republic of China
Rouran
Yujiulü clan